Néstor Francisco Nieves (born December 29, 1974) is a retired middle- and long-distance runner from Venezuela. 
 
He won the gold medal in the men's 3000 metres steeplechase event at the 2003 Pan American Games in Santo Domingo, Dominican Republic. Nieves represented his native country at the 1996 Summer Olympics in Atlanta, Georgia. He was the bronze medallist at the 1998 Ibero-American Championships in Athletics.

Regionally, he won medals at the South American Games, Central American and Caribbean Games, Bolivarian Games and the Central American and Caribbean Championships in Athletics. He was the 2003 gold medallist in the steeplechase at the South American Championships in Athletics.

He was highly success at regional age category competitions, with a highlight being a triple gold medal win at the 1990 Central American and Caribbean Junior Championships in Athletics, which included a championship record in the 2000 metres steeplechase.

International competitions

References

 sports-reference

External links
 Picture of Néstor Nieves
 

1974 births
Living people
Venezuelan male middle-distance runners
Venezuelan male steeplechase runners
Athletes (track and field) at the 1996 Summer Olympics
Olympic athletes of Venezuela
Pan American Games medalists in athletics (track and field)
Athletes (track and field) at the 2003 Pan American Games
World Athletics Championships athletes for Venezuela
Venezuelan male long-distance runners
Pan American Games gold medalists for Venezuela
South American Games bronze medalists for Venezuela
South American Games medalists in athletics
Competitors at the 1994 South American Games
Central American and Caribbean Games silver medalists for Venezuela
Central American and Caribbean Games bronze medalists for Venezuela
Competitors at the 2002 Central American and Caribbean Games
Competitors at the 2006 Central American and Caribbean Games
Central American and Caribbean Games medalists in athletics
Medalists at the 2003 Pan American Games
20th-century Venezuelan people
21st-century Venezuelan people